The ninth season of La Voz premiered on June 2, 2020, on Azteca Uno. Ricardo Montaner and Belinda returned for their second season as coaches. Meanwhile, María José and Christian Nodal joined the panel replacing Yahir and Lupillo Rivera. Last season's host Jimena Pérez was replaced by Eddy Vilard and Sofía Aragón.

This season was originally scheduled for March 30, 2020 but due to the COVID-19 pandemic, TV Azteca announced that the show was postponed until further notice to protect everyone's health. It was later announced the date was moved to June 2.

The block button returned for this season, this button is used when a coach wants to prevent another coach from getting an artist they like. Each coach had two block opportunities through the whole blind auditions. This feature was first and last seen in the seventh season, which was produced by Televisa.

On Monday, August 31, 2020, Fernando Sujo was announced the winner and crowned La Voz México 2020, alongside his coach Christian Nodal. With Nodal's win, this makes him the youngest winning coach throughout the entire The Voice franchise.

Coaches 

On January 21, 2020, TV Azteca officially confirmed that Ricardo Montaner and Belinda would be returning for their second season as coaches, with new coaches María José and Christian Nodal. With Nodal joining as a coach, this made him the youngest coach throughout the whole The Voice franchise, beating Tini Stoessel from La Voz Argentina.

For the second season in the row, no advisors were present for neither the Knockout or Battle Rounds.

Teams 
Color key

 Winner
 Runner-up
 Third place
 Fourth place
 Eliminated in the Final Phase
 Eliminated in the Top 3
 Stolen in the Battles
 Eliminated in the Battles
 Stolen in the Knockouts
 Eliminated in the Knockouts
 Withdrew

Blind Auditions 
In the Blind Auditions, each coach had to complete their teams with 42 contestants. Each coach had two Blocks to prevent one of the other coaches from getting a contestant.

Color key

Episode 1 (June 2) 
The coaches performed "Feeling Good" at the beginning of the episode.

Episode 2 (June 3) 
During the episode, Christian Nodal performed "Adiós Amor".

Episode 3 (June 8) 

During the episode, María José performed "Adelante Corazón".

Episode 4 (June 9) 

During the episode, Belinda performed "Bella Traición".

Episode 5 (June 10) 

During the episode, Ricardo Montaner performed "La Cima del Cielo".

Episode 6 (June 11)

Episode 7 (June 15) 

During the episode, Christian Nodal performed "De Los Besos Que Te Di".

Episode 8 (June 16) 

During the episode, María José performed "Lo Que Tenías Conmigo".

Episode 9 (June 17) 
During the episode, Ricardo Montaner performed "Será".

Episode 10 (June 18) 

During the episode, Belinda performed Luz Sin Gravedad.

Episode 11 (June 22)

Episode 12 (June 23)

Episode 13 (June 24)

Episode 14 (June 25)

Episode 15 (June 29)

Episode 16 (June 30) 
During the episode, Ricardo Montaner performed "Te Adoraré" and Christian Nodal performed "No Te Contaron Mal".

Episode 17 (July 1) 
During the episode, María José performed "Evidencias".

Episode 18 (July 2) 
During the episode, Belinda performed "En El Amor Hay Que Perdonar".

Episode 19 (July 6) 
During the episode Christian Nodal performed "Adiós Amor" and María José performed "Lo Que Tenías Conmigo".

Episode 20 (July 7) 
During the episode Ricardo Montaner performed "Tan Enamorados" and Belinda performed "Litost".

The Knockouts 
The Knockout Rounds started July 13. Unlike season eight where coaches had three steals, this season coaches can steal two losing artists from other coaches. Contestants who win their knockout or are stolen by another coach advance to The Battles.

Color key:

The Battles 
The Battle Round started on August 4. The coaches can steal two losing artists from other coaches. Contestants who win their battle or are stolen by another coach will advance to the Top 3 Round.

Color key:

Top 3 
The Top 3 Round started on August 18. After every performance, the artist's coach decides if the artist deserves a spot in the team's Top 3. If yes, the artist is given a chair by their coach. When all chairs are occupied the coach chooses an artist to seize his/her spot to the new artist and gets eliminated. Artists who are denied a chair by the coach are automatically eliminated. The Top 3 from each team advanced to the Semifinal.

Color key

Final phase 
This season, the Live shows had several changes: the Quarterfinals were removed, the Semifinals were pre-recorded, but the Finale was live and the public was able to vote for the winner.

Color key:

Week 1: Semifinal (August 25) 

In the Semifinal, the twelve remaining participants performed in order to become one of their coach's choice to advance into the Finale. Each coach advanced with two artists, with the third member being eliminated.

Week 2: Finale (August 31) 
The Finale was broadcast live on August 31, and consisted of two rounds. In the first round, the participants sang a solo song, followed by team performances. After the team performance, the coach had to choose one artist to advance onto the second round. In the second round, the public then had to vote for their favorite, with results being announced at the end of the night.

First round

Second round

Elimination Chart

Overall 
Color key
Artist's info

Result details

Ratings

Artists who appeared on other shows or in previous seasons 

 Ángel Moré, Anilú Dávila, Kelly Castro (as Hidekel Castro), Aranda Brizelly and Montse Bernal participated in the eight season. They were eliminated by not turning any chairs
 Nicholas Thomas Griffin participated in the eight season in Lupillo Rivera's team
 Alonso Hernández participated in the second season in Paulina Rubio's team
 Josafat Silva (of Josafat and Imanol) participated in the second season of "Pequeños Gigantes"
 Karely Esparza participated in the fourth season in Julión Álvarez's team
 Daniela Pedali participated in the fourth season in Ricky Martin's team, later stolen by Julión Álvarez
 Damiana Conde from "Las Conde" participated in the first and sixth seasons in the teams of Alejandro Sanz and Yuri respectively. Damiana is the first participant of the format in Mexico to have participated on three different occasions.
 Karina Esparza participated in the fourth season. She was eliminated by not flipping any chairs.
 Fabiola Jaramillo participated in the seventh season of La Academia
 Eddy Peña participated in the fifth season (in a duet with Jairo Calderón) in the Los Tigres del Norte's team
 Arnoldo Tapia participated in the Mexican reality show La Apuesta in David Bisbal's team and in the fifth season, being eliminated by not turning any chair
 Abner Medina was a participant in the Mexican reality show La Apuesta in Pepe Aguilar's team
 Sebastián Miranda participated in the sixth season (in a duet with Tyrone Díaz) in Maluma's team
 Kike Jiménez was the runner-up in the fourth season in Laura Pausini's team
 Nain Jurado participated in the third season, being eliminated by not turning any chairs
 Vanessa Payán was a participant in the Mexican reality show La Apuesta as "Payán" in David Bisbal's team
 Antonio Ramírez participated in the second season of "Pequeños Gigantes" as "Toñito Ramírez"
 Marco Silva from "Vivozes" participated in the fourth generation of La Academia

References

Mexico
2020 Mexican television seasons